The Pratt Institute School of Architecture is located in New York City with courses being taught at Brooklyn and Manhattan campuses. In 2012 the journal 'DesignIntelligence' ranked it in the ten best architecture schools in the United States. 
Alumni include Pascale Sablan, William Van Alen, Ralph Appelbaum Associates, Annabelle Selldorf, Richard Foster, George Ranalli, Carlos Zapata, and Pritzker Prize winner Peter Zumthor. The School was created in 1928 and by 1954 was recognized as being full degree-granting Undergraduate and Graduate program. Undergraduate architecture is the largest program in both the School of Architecture and Pratt Institute at large with over 550 students. Within the Brooklyn campus, the school of architecture is located a block from the main campus in Higgins Hall (designed by Steven Holl).

Degrees and minors
The school offers the following degrees and minors:

Undergraduate
 Bachelor of Architecture (First-professional)
 Bachelor of Science in Construction Management (Manhattan Campus)
 Bachelor of Professional Studies in Construction Management (Manhattan Campus)
 Associate of Applied Science in Building and Construction (Manhattan Campus) 

Undergraduate Minors:
 Minor in Construction Management
 Minor in Architectural Theory and Technology 
 Minor in Morphology

Graduate
 Master of Architecture (First-professional)
 Master of Science in Architecture (Post-professional)
 Master of Science in Architecture and Urban Design (Post-professional)
 Master of Science in City and Regional Planning
 Master of Science in Urban Environmental Systems Management
 Master of Science in Historic Preservation (Manhattan Campus)
 Master of Science in Facilities Management (Manhattan Campus)
 Master of Science in Real Estate Practice (Manhattan Campus)

Alumni 
 Joe Amisano (1917-2008)
 Ralph Appelbaum Associates
 Charles Belfoure
 Guy Bolton (1884-1979)
 Elizabeth Crowley
 Johannes Knoops (1962- )
 Henry F. Ludorf (1888-1968)
 Elisabeth Martini (1886-1984)
 Henry V. Murphy (1888-1960)
 J. Gerald Phelan (1893-1981)
 John M. Pierce (1886-1958)
 George Ranalli (1946- )
 Annabelle Selldorf
 William Van Alen
 Carlos Zapata
 Peter Zumthor

Additional resources
 American Institute of Architecture Students Chapter
 Berlin and China Summer Program
 Undergraduate Rome Program, sharing studio space with the University of Waterloo, School of Architecture in Piazza de Santa Maria in Trastevere
 Yearly student work publication, in Process

References

Architecture schools in New York City
Pratt Institute